Agathymus stephensi, the California giant skipper, is a species of giant skipper in the butterfly family Hesperiidae. It is found in Central America and North America.

The MONA or Hodges number for Agathymus stephensi is 4142.

References

Further reading

 

Megathyminae
Articles created by Qbugbot
Butterflies described in 1912